Ayatollah Mohammad Momen (13 January 1938 – 21 February 2019) was a Faqih (a cleric qualified to judge based on Islamic law) and a very influential member of the Guardian Council of the Islamic Republic of Iran.

Influence in government
He simultaneously sat on the Expediency Discernment Council and the Assembly of Experts, representing the Islamic holy city of Qom in the latter and winning in the 2006 Iranian Assembly of Experts election. He gained a very large percentage of the vote. His opponent, Ayatollah Mohammad Taqi Mesbah-Yazdi, was a strong supporter and spiritual mentor of President Mahmoud Ahmadinejad, and his victory has been interpreted by some as a sign of dissatisfaction with Ahmedinejad's policies. Because of his political influence in the government, Siyasat, a conservative weekly periodical, had been touted, along with the hard-line conservative Ayatollah Morteza Moghtadai, to be a possible replacement for Judiciary Chief Ayatollah Mohammad Yazdi.

Political position
He was a moderate conservative, and was considered to be an excellent student of the Qur'an. He was a notable figure among fundamentalists in Iran. Some considered him to be more of a theologian than a politician.

References

1938 births
2019 deaths
Iranian ayatollahs
Members of the Expediency Discernment Council
Members of the Guardian Council
Members of the Assembly of Experts
People from Qom
Society of Seminary Teachers of Qom members
Islamic Republican Party politicians